"Belgium Put the Kibosh on the Kaiser" was a popular British patriotic song of the First World War. It was first recorded on 6 October 1914 by Mark Sheridan. The song refers to the 1914 campaign in Belgium when the small British Expeditionary Force, along with an unexpectedly fierce Belgian defence, managed to delay the much larger German army, slowing them and wrecking the Schlieffen Plan which depended on total victory against the French to the west in a matter of weeks.  By attacking Belgium, they had violated that nation's neutrality and brought the British Empire into the war because of a pledge to uphold Belgian independence.   The song has the metre of "Tramp! Tramp! Tramp!".

Reception
The song had an early spike in popularity, but fell out of favour after early 1915.

In popular culture
It was featured in the stage musical (1963) and musical film (1969) Oh! What a Lovely War.

Lyrics

References

1914 songs
British patriotic songs
Songs about the military
Songs of World War I
Song articles with missing songwriters